Sobrenatural (English: Supernatural) is the Latin Grammy-nominated second / third studio album by Puerto Rican reggaeton duo Alexis & Fido released on January 8, 2008 by Sony BMG Latin. The first single from the album is titled "5 Letras" and is produced by Doble A & Nales "Los Presidentes". Artists featured on the album are Ñejo & Dalmata, Toby Love, De La Ghetto, Voltio, Jadiel, Erick Right and Los Yetzons, a duo signed on to their Wild Dogz label. Doble A & Nales "Los Presidentes" produced the bulk of the album. Sobrenatural was nominated for a Lo Nuestro Award for Urban Album of the Year.

The album was supported with the Sobrenatural Tour.

Track listing

Tour

The album was support by The Sobrenatural Tour, which started with the song "5 letras" and ended with the song "Sobrenatural." The show featured fire, screens, pyrotechnics and dancers plus DJ. Their opening act featured "Los Yetzon," a group of singers who were friends of them.

Charts

Weekly charts

Year-end charts

Sales and certifications

Nominations
The duo received 2 Latin Grammy Awards nominations for Best Urban Music Album for Sobrenatural and Best Urban Song for Soy Igual Que Tú.

References

2007 albums
Alexis & Fido albums